En route may refer to:
 En Route (novel), an 1895 novel by Joris-Karl Huysmans
 En Route (film), a 2004 German movie directed by Jan Krüger
 En-route chart, in aeronautics
 enRoute (credit card), Air Canada's credit card division, now merged with Diners Club
 enRoute (magazine), Air Canada's in-flight magazine
 "V Put" ("En Route"), a 1954 Soviet song by Vasili Solovyov-Sedoi, Les Chœurs De L'Armée Soviétique  
 En Route (album), a 1995 album by Moebius and Plank
 En Route, an album by Orquesta Aragón, 2011